Hebius terrakarenorum is a species of snake of the family Colubridae. The snake is found in Thailand.

References 

terrakarenorum
Reptiles of Thailand
Reptiles described in 2022